Desulfonatronum  is a Gram-negative and extremely alkaliphilic bacteria genus from the family of Desulfovibrionaceae.

Phylogeny
The currently accepted taxonomy is based on the List of Prokaryotic names with Standing in Nomenclature (LPSN) and National Center for Biotechnology Information (NCBI)

See also
 List of bacterial orders
 List of bacteria genera

References

Further reading
 
 
 
 
 

Bacteria genera
Desulfovibrionales